Beyblade is a Japanese animated television series and has total 716 episodes.

Series overview

Episode list

Beyblade
List of original Beyblade episodes
List of Beyblade episodes
List of Beyblade V-Force episodes
List of Beyblade G-Revolution episodes

Beyblade: Metal Saga
List of Beyblade: Metal Saga episodes
List of Beyblade: Metal Fusion episodes
List of Beyblade: Metal Masters episodes
List of Beyblade: Metal Fury episodes
List of Beyblade: Shogun Steel episodes

Beyblade Burst
List of Beyblade Burst episodes
List of Beyblade Burst episodes
List of Beyblade Burst Evolution episodes
List of Beyblade Burst Turbo episodes
List of Beyblade Burst Rise episodes
List of Beyblade Burst Surge episodes
List of Beyblade Burst QuadDrive episodes

References

External links